Unsung Story is a tactical role-playing game in development by Little Orbit. The game was announced via the crowdfunding platform Kickstarter in early 2014 by developer Playdek under the creative direction of Yasumi Matsuno. The game is meant to be a spiritual successor of Final Fantasy Tactics (1997), a game he directed. 

In February 2016, Playdek announced that development had been stopped for lack of resources. In early 2017, Playdek announced that Little Orbit would continue the game's development in their place, with Little Orbit buying all of the rights and assets. Unsung Story was released in early access for Microsoft Windows on December 17, 2020, with the full version in development for Windows, macOS, Linux, iOS, Android, Nintendo Switch, PlayStation 4, and Xbox One.

References

External links
 

Early access video games
Kickstarter-funded video games
Tactical role-playing video games
Upcoming video games
Windows games
MacOS games
Linux games
iOS games
Xbox One games
PlayStation 4 games
Nintendo Switch games
Android (operating system) games
Video games scored by Hitoshi Sakimoto
Single-player video games